The New Hampshire Republican State Committee is the affiliate of the United States Republican Party in New Hampshire. Its executive committee is headed by Chairman Stephen Stepanek.

Current elected officials
The New Hampshire Republican Party holds a majority in the New Hampshire Senate and the New Hampshire House of Representatives. Republicans do not hold any seats in the U.S. Senate or the U.S. House.

Members of Congress

U.S. Senate
None
Both of New Hampshire’s U.S. Senate seats have been held by Democrats since 2017. Kelly Ayotte was the last Republican to represent New Hampshire in the U.S. Senate.

U.S. House of Representatives
None
Both of New Hampshire’s congressional seats have been held by Democrats since 2017. Frank Guinta was the last Republican to represent New Hampshire in the House of Representatives. Re-elected to a non-consecutive second term in 2014, Guinta was defeated again by Carol Shea-Porter in 2016.

State government
Governor of New Hampshire: Chris Sununu
Senate Leader: Chuck Morse
House Leader: Sherman Packard

Executive committee
Chair: Chris Ager
Vice Chair: Ryan Terrell 
National Committeewoman: Juliana Bergeron
National Committeeman: vacant 
Treasurer: Alan Glassman
Assistant Treasurer: Jim MacEachern
Secretary: Jane Lane
Assistant Secretary: Thad Riley

Former chairpersons
Fergus Cullen
Stephen Duprey
Jeanie Forrester
Warren Henderson
Jennifer Horn — 2014-2017
Shirley Hodgdon
Jack Kimball
Wayne MacDonald
Jayne Millerick
Wayne Semprini
John Stabile
John H. Sununu

Notes

External links
Republican Party of New Hampshire

Republican State Committee
New Hampshire